Eddie Joe Williams (born June 26, 1954) is an American politician who served as a member of the Arkansas Senate for the 29th district from 2011 to 2017. During his tenure in the Senate, Williams served as majority leader.

Early life
Williams was born in Sheridan, Arkansas. He graduated from Sheridan High School in 1972.

Career
Williams served in the United States Army and worked for the Union Pacific Railroad for thirty years. He served on the Cabot Planning Commission and the Cabot City Council before he was elected three times as mayor. He faced a $500,000 deficit when he became mayor of Cabot, Arkansas.

Williams is a member of the American Legislative Exchange Council (ALEC), a conservative non-partisan, non-profit legislative association. He and Arkansas State Auditor Andrea Lea, served at one time as the state co-chairs of the organization.
On October 26, 2017, President Donald Trump appointed Williams as his federal representative to the Southern States Energy Board. Since leaving the Senate, Williams has served as senior legislative liaison to Governor Asa Hutchinson.

In September 2021, Williams declared his candidacy for secretary of state of Arkansas in the 2022 election. In an interview following his candidacy, Williams claimed that he wasn't sure if Biden won the 2020 presidential election, and gave credence to false allegations of voter fraud by claiming that full investigations into voter fraud in swing states might have tilted the election for Biden.

Personal life
Williams and his wife, DeLona, have four daughters and seven grandchildren.

References

1954 births
Living people
20th-century American railroad executives
Republican Party Arkansas state senators
Mayors of places in Arkansas
People from Sheridan, Arkansas
People from Cabot, Arkansas
United States Army officers
21st-century American politicians